The 2010 UNAF U-23 Tournament is an association football tournament open to the Under-23 national teams of UNAF member countries. The tournament took place between 13 December and 18 December 2010 in Morocco with matches held in the cities of El Jadida, Casablanca and Mohammédia. Cameroon was invited to the tournament to replace Tunisia.

Algeria won the tournament after beating all three teams and finishing the group stage with 9 points. Morocco finished in second place with 6 points, 2 wins and a loss.

Participants

 (invited)

Venues

Matches

Champions

Scorers
3 goals
 Oussama Mesfar

2 goals
 Mohamed Khoutir Ziti
 Abderrazak Hamdallah

1 goal
 Abdelaziz Ali Guechi
 Brahim Bedbouda
 Essaïd Belkalem
 Mehdi Benaldjia
 Rafik Boulaïnceur
 Saïd Sayah
 Amine Touahri
 Beb Ga Bissai
 Mohamed Ali Bamaâmar
 Zakaria Hadraf
 Yassine Lakhal

Own goals
1 goal
 Youcef Belaïli (playing against Cameroon)
 Sim Nanguelle (playing against Morocco)

References 

2010
2010 in African football
International association football competitions hosted by Morocco
2010–11 in Moroccan football
2010 in Cameroonian football
2010–11 in Algerian football
2010–11 in Libyan football